Pahuldip Singh Sandhu (born 5 February 1987), known by his stage name Steel Banglez, is a British record producer and musician of Indian Punjabi descent. He is currently signed to Warner Bros. Records. Best known for his production work with artists including Mist, MoStack, J Hus and Wiley, Steel Banglez achieved his first chart hit as a lead artist when his track "Bad" reached the top 30 on the UK Singles Chart in February 2018. His highest charting single on the UK Singles Chart is "Fashion Week" featuring British rappers AJ Tracey and MoStack which peaked at number 7.

Early life 
Born in Forest Gate, Sandhu grew up in Newham, east London. Raised in a Sikh family, he was surrounded by traditional Indian instruments such as harmoniums and tablas as his mother was a music teacher. In addition to being of Indian Punjabi descent, Sandhu has also stated to have Pakistani, Bangladeshi and Sri Lankan ancestry.

At the age of 10, he started DJing jungle music alongside his brothers and subsequently presented a show on the pirate radio station Mystic FM. He started producing music in his early teens after a teacher introduced him to the audio workstation Fruity Loops, and soon produced his first track "Dreams" for his neighbour, the influential grime artist D Double E. He soon gained further exposure when he produced the Big H freestyle from the Practise Hours 2 DVD.

Steel Banglez's career was halted when he was imprisoned at the age of 17, serving three years of a six-year sentence for the possession of a firearm with the intent to endanger lives.

Music career

2005–2014: Early music career 
While in prison, Steel Banglez befriended the rappers Fix Dot’M, Yung Meth and Colours Miyagi, and would produce beats for them on a keyboard. This resulted in his musical direction becoming focused upon rap, and he also gained attention in south London where the centre of the capital's rap scene was based. His earliest production credits came in the mid-2000s. He produced “Colours” by D Double E and Big H’s Practice Hours 2 Freestyle. 

After being released, Steel Banglez contributed production to Fix Dot'M and Yung Meth's mixtape A Fix of Meth, and he teamed up again with Yung Meth, this time with Ghetts, on "Tidal Wave" which was released on SB.TV. He soon started working on tracks with a wider range of artists, such as "Breakdown" (with Big H, P Money, Wiley and Ghetts) and "Go Down South" (with Krept, Konan, Chip and Yungen, Not3s and James Lukezo of zua visa).

Eager to establish his credentials as a producer, Steel Banglez ran a home studio from his manager's house which offered free studio time to artists, with Wiley and Roll Deep two of the highest profile names to put their vocals to his beats. Steel Banglez later moved to a professional studio in what is now the Link Up TV office where he worked with Cashtastic, Yungen and Krept and Konan. In 2014, Steel Banglez focused on producing Cashtastic's debut album which was due to be released by Universal Music. However, that project ended when Cashtastic was deported to Jamaica as part of the Hostile Environment policy. As a result, new production work dried up and Steel Banglez lost direction in what he calls a “mad depressed stage” in his life.

2015–present: Solo career and wider production work 
Steel Banglez was newly inspired when he heard the track "No Buddy" by MoStack in the summer of 2015. They connected via Twitter, and Steel Banglez produced his debut mixtape Gangster with Banter. On New Year's Eve of 2015, he first heard MIST and realised that the Birmingham-based rapper's use of phrases from the Punjabi language would help him connect with a large audience.

After making contact via Instagram, Steel Banglez drove MIST to his studio in London where he played him the beat of what would become the track "Karlas Back". He produced MIST's breakthrough EP M I S T to the T in 2016 and then acted as executive producer on his Warner Bros. Records debut Diamond in the Dirt in 2018, which featured artists including MoStack, Jessie Ware and Haile from WSTRN. Another high-profile production came when he collaborated with Jae5 on "Fisherman", a track from J Hus' debut album Common Sense.

Steel Banglez's career as a lead artist was also gaining momentum. He signed a publishing deal with Warner/Chappell Music in April 2017 before signing to Warner Bros. Records, together with his imprint Spiritual Records, later renamed Gifted Music, in April 2017.

He released "Money" in March 2017, which featured several of his friends and collaborators such as MoStack, MIST, Haile and Abra Cadabra. MoStack also appeared on the follow-up single "Bad" alongside Yungen, Mr Eazi and Not3s. Released in November, "Bad" climbed the UK Singles Chart for several weeks before peaking at number 29 in February. In March, the track was certified Silver by the BPI in recognition of 200,000 sales.

Steel Banglez won Producer of the Year at GRM Daily's Rated Awards 2017.

In 2018 he won Best Non-Traditional Asian Act at Brit Asia TV Music Awards (BAMA), an award which he won again at BAMA 2019.

Personal life 
Steel Banglez's success has allowed him to help his family by funding his mother's retirement and his sister's university fees. He was given the nickname Steel Banglez by a Jamaican friend in reference to the karas (steel bracelets) that he wears as a Sikh.

Steel Banglez is an avid supporter of West Ham United F.C.

Discography

Singles

Guest appearances

Production credits

References

External links 
 

English record producers
People from Forest Gate
English Sikhs
English hip hop musicians
English people of Punjabi descent
English people of Indian descent
1987 births
Living people
Musicians from London
Warner Records artists